Cees de Vreugd, also known as "Kees de Vreugd" (9 March 1952 – 7 October 1998) was a butcher, strongman and powerlifter from Katwijk, Netherlands. He finished third at the World's Strongest Man games in 1985.

After competing in soccer in his youth, De Vreugd started weightlifting very late at the age of 29 in 1981. In 1982 he began competing as a powerlifter, and won the Dutch National Championships in 1983. De Vreugd won the IPF World Powerlifting Championships in the +125 kg class in 1985. De Vreugd was the first European to total 2,200 lb (1,000 kg) in powerlifting in 1985, including a 927 lb (420 kg) squat. Later that year he made a total of 1002,5 kg which was the Dutch record for 32 years (until November 2017). Without using a bench shirt (what holds the upper body tight) it's still the raw Dutch record. The squat (420 kg) earlier in 1985 still stands as the Dutch record in April 2022. 
De Vreugd competed at 6 ft 1 in (185 cm) and approximately 311 lb (142 kg) during his strongman career.

Death 
In 1998 De Vreugd died of a heart attack. De Vreugd is buried at a cemetery named Duinrust, located in Katwijk aan Zee.

Honours
Second place Strongest man of the Netherlands (1984)
Third place World's Strongest Man  (1985)

External links 
 Pictures and info, Cees de Vreugd

References 

1952 births
1998 deaths
Dutch strength athletes
Sportspeople from Katwijk
Dutch powerlifters